A.S.D. Asti, known as Asti and formerly A.S.D. Alfieri Asti or A.S.D. Colline Alfieri Don Bosco (Colline Alfieri D.B. or just Colline Alfieri), is an Italian football club based in Asti, Piedmont. FIGC registration number of the club is 63,519. The club spent entire history in the Piedmont - Aosta Valley divisions of the Lega Nazionale Dilettanti.

History
The club was founded in 1975. The club was based in another town, Celle Enomondo, and known as several other names: ILSA C.D.C., U.S. Cellese, A.S. Celle Vaglierano and A.C. Celle General Cab.

The club was promoted to Prima Categoria for the first time in 2009, as the winner of Group P of Seconda Categoria Piedmont - Aosta Valley. Group P was composed of clubs entirely from the Province of Asti.

In 2010 the club was promoted to Promozione Piedmont - Aosta Valley division, despite finished as the fifth of Prima Categoria Piedmont - Aosta Valley Group F. At the same time the club was renamed to A.S.D. Colline Alfieri Don Bosco, as a collaboration with another sport club A.S.D. Don Bosco Asti. The club also relocated its registered office to San Damiano d'Asti at the same time.

A.S.D. Colline Alfieri Don Bosco promoted to Eccellenza Piedmont-Aosta Valley from Promozione Piedmont - Aosta Valley in 2016 as a repêchage. The club also played in the Eccellenza division in the 2013–14 and 2014–15 seasons. The club hired Mario Benzi as head coach in November 2014.

The club was renamed to "A.S.D. Alfieri Asti" in 2017. At the same time, the major club of the city, Asti Calcio F.C. (ex-A.C.D. Asti) folded. The club also promoted youth team coach Davide Montanarelli as the head coach of the first team.

The club finished as the joint-runner-up of the Group B of Eccellenza Piedmont - Aosta Valley division in the 2018–19 season. However, the club lost the promotion play-off against the other runner-up, Canelli S.D.S. Both teams also from the Province of Asti and that match was the fifth provincial derby of the teams in that season.

In 2019, Alfieri Asti was renamed again, dropping the word "Alfieri".

Famous players
  Diego Fuser (former Italian international footballer)

Stadiums
The club uses the Stadio Comunale di Asti as home stadium. The stadium is also known as Stadio Censin Bosia, named after footballer . A.S.D. Asti shared the stadium with two other clubs of the city: San Domenico Savio and Nuova Sca, and in the past, Asti Calcio F.C.

The club also used Campo Sandro Salvadore as well as Campo Comunale di Celle Enomondo, on 9 Strada Pozzo, Celle Enomondo as football fields.

In 2015–16 season, the first team of the club had used the football field in Moncalvo, but declared its headquarters in Asti.

Honours
 Promozione Piedmont - Aosta Valley Group D
 Winners: 2013
 Seconda Categoria Piedmont - Aosta Valley Group P
 Winners: 2009

See also
 John Bosco, or known as Don Bosco

Footnotes

References

External links
 https://www.asdasti.it/ (official website)

Football clubs in Italy
Football clubs in Piedmont and Aosta Valley
Asti
Association football clubs established in 1975
1975 establishments in Italy